Stronghurst Township is one of eleven townships in Henderson County, Illinois, USA.  As of the 2010 census, its population was 1,115 and it contained 500 housing units.

Geography

Cities, towns, villages
 Stronghurst (west three-quarters)

Unincorporated towns
 Decorra at 
 Hopper at 
 Olena at 
(This list is based on USGS data and may include former settlements.)

Cemeteries
The township contains these five cemeteries: Best, Hopper, Maple Grove, Olena and Watson.

Major highways
  Illinois Route 94

Demographics

School districts
 West Central Community Unit School District 235

Political districts
 Illinois's 17th congressional district
 State House District 94
 State Senate District 47

References
 United States Census Bureau 2008 TIGER/Line Shapefiles
 
 United States National Atlas

External links
 City-Data.com
 Illinois State Archives
 Township Officials of Illinois

Townships in Henderson County, Illinois
Townships in Illinois